Slobodan Marković (born 9 November 1978) is a Serbian former professional footballer who played mainly as a defensive midfielder.

During his club career, Marković represented exclusively Serbian and Ukrainian clubs, including Borac Čačak, Železnik, Metalurh Donetsk, Vojvodina and Tavriya Simferopol.

At international level, Marković earned three caps for Serbia and Montenegro in 2003, making his debut in a friendly against England.

External links

 
 Reprezentacija profile
 

Association football midfielders
Expatriate footballers in Ukraine
FC Metalurh Donetsk players
FK Borac Čačak players
FK Sinđelić Beograd players
FK Vojvodina players
FK Voždovac players
FK Železnik players
SC Tavriya Simferopol players
Serbia and Montenegro expatriate footballers
Serbia and Montenegro footballers
Serbia and Montenegro expatriate sportspeople in Ukraine
Serbia and Montenegro international footballers
Serbian expatriate footballers
Serbian expatriate sportspeople in Ukraine
Serbian footballers
Serbian SuperLiga players
Sportspeople from Čačak
Ukrainian Premier League players
1978 births
Living people